The 1945–46 Northern Football League season was the 48th in the history of the Northern Football League, a football competition in Northern England.

Clubs

From the 14 clubs which competed in the 1939-40 season:
 4 did not reappear
 Billingham
 Brandon Social 
 Cockfield
 Crook Town
 2 were non-playing members in this season
 Heaton Stannington
 Whitby United

Also 4 new clubs joined the league:
 Billingham Synthonia
 Brandon Welfare
 Crook Colliery Welfare
 Stanley United

League table

References

1945-46
4